Martin Wood is a Canadian television director who has been directing since the mid-1990s. He specializes in science fiction, where he is best known for his work as a director and producer on Stargate SG-1 (46 episodes), as well as its spin-off series Stargate Atlantis (30 episodes).

Career
Martin Wood began his television career in 1995. Although he is best known for his work on the Stargate franchise's Stargate SG-1 and Stargate Atlantis, he has also directed for many other television series, including The Invisible Man and Earth: Final Conflict. In addition, Martin directed two TV specials on sudden infant death syndrome.

Along with Peter DeLuise, Andy Mikita and Will Waring, Wood was one of Stargate SG-1's main directors during its 10-year run. He also frequently appears as an extra known as "Major Wood" in the Stargate SG-1 episodes that he directs, often assisting Sergeant Siler as a repairman using the oversized crescent wrench that serves as an inside joke. He is also featured on many Stargate SG-1 and Stargate Atlantis DVD special features, such as featurettes and audio commentaries.

Between 2008 and 2011, Wood directed several episodes of the science-fiction series Sanctuary, starring Amanda Tapping and Christopher Heyerdahl. He was also set to direct Stargate: Revolution (working title), the third Stargate SG-1 direct-to-DVD movie, but that production has been shelved indefinitely.

Filmography

Awards and nominations
Wood has won 1 award, out of 5 nominations.

References

External links

 Martin Wood at Stargate Official Site
Martin Wood on StargateWiki

Living people
Canadian film directors
Canadian television directors
Canadian cinematographers
Canadian television producers
Year of birth missing (living people)